Rudolf Pěnkava (born November 21, 1945) is a Czechoslovak sprint canoeist who competed in the mid to late 1960s. He won the silver medal in the C-1 10000 m event at the 1966 ICF Canoe Sprint World Championships in East Berlin.

Pěnkava also competed in two Summer Olympics, earning his best finish of eighth in the C-2 1000 m event at Tokyo in 1964.

References

Sports-reference.com profile

1945 births
Canoeists at the 1964 Summer Olympics
Canoeists at the 1968 Summer Olympics
Czechoslovak male canoeists
Living people
Olympic canoeists of Czechoslovakia
ICF Canoe Sprint World Championships medalists in Canadian